Tazian or Taziyan or Tazeyan may refer to:
 Tazian-e Bala, Hormozgan Province
 Tazian-e Pain, Hormozgan Province
 Tazian Rural District, in Hormozgan Province
 Tazian, former name of Golzar, Kerman